The 2006 National Premier Soccer League season was the 4th season of the NPSL. The season started in May 2006, and ended with the NPSL Championship Game in August 2006.

Sacramento Knights finished the season as national champions, beating Princeton 56ers in the NPSL Championship game

Changes From 2005

New Franchises
Five franchises joined the league this year, all expansion franchises:

Name Changes
 Minnesota Blast changed its name to Minnesota NSC United

Final standings
Purple indicates division title clinched

Northwest Division

Midwest Division

Southwest Division

Playoffs
Sacramento Knights 2 - 1 Princeton 56ers

Bracket

References
 US soccer history archives for 2006

2006
4